Bigonville is a small town in the commune of Rambrouch, in western Luxembourg.  , the town has a population of 450.

Bigonville was a commune in the canton of Redange until 1 January 1979, when it was merged with the communes of Arsdorf, Folschette, and Perlé to form the new commune of Rambrouch.  The law creating Rambrouch was passed on 27 July 1978.

Use in popular culture
Bigonville is the home of a professional Quidditch team, the Bigonville Bombers, operating within the fictional Harry Potter universe.

References

External links

 Resident's website on Bigonville in the Second World War

Rambrouch
Former communes of Luxembourg
Towns in Luxembourg